The 2022 Trofeo BMW Cup was a professional tennis tournament played on outdoor clay courts. It was the seventeenth edition of the tournament which was part of the 2022 ITF Women's World Tennis Tour. It took place in Rome, Italy between 16 and 22 May 2022.

Singles main draw entrants

Seeds

 1 Rankings are as of 9 May 2022.

Other entrants
The following players received wildcards into the singles main draw:
  Giulia Crescenzi
  Lisa Pigato
  Angelica Raggi
  Camilla Rosatello

The following players received entry from the qualifying draw:
  Jessie Aney
  Nuria Brancaccio
  Sara Cakarevic
  Deborah Chiesa
  Ilona Georgiana Ghioroaie
  Jazmín Ortenzi
  Stefania Rubini
  Sapfo Sakellaridi

Champions

Singles

  Tena Lukas def.  Bárbara Gatica, 6–1, 6–4

Doubles

  Matilde Paoletti /  Lisa Pigato def.  Darya Astakhova /  Daniela Vismane, 6–3, 7–6(9–7)

References

External links
 2022 Trofeo BMW Cup at ITFtennis.com
 Official website

2022 ITF Women's World Tennis Tour
2022 in Italian tennis
May 2022 sports events in Italy